The 1874 Dudley by-election was fought on 21 May 1874 shortly after the February General Election, which had brought about the re-election of the Liberal MP Henry Brinsley Sheridan. The election was declared void 4 May 1874, triggering a by-election. Sheridan had been first elected as the Member of Parliament (MP) for Dudley in 1857.  At the subsequent by-election held on 21 May 1874, he was again returned, defeating the ironmaster, Noah Hingley.

References

1874 in England
Politics of Dudley
1874 elections in the United Kingdom
By-elections to the Parliament of the United Kingdom in West Midlands (county) constituencies
By-elections to the Parliament of the United Kingdom in Worcestershire constituencies
19th century in Worcestershire